Henry Krauss (26 April 1866 – 15 December 1935) was a French actor of stage and screen. He is sometimes credited as Henri Krauss. He was the father of the art director Jacques Krauss.

Partial filmography

 The Hunchback of Notre Dame (1911, Short) - Quasimodo
 Les mystères de Paris (1912)
 Les misérables (1912-1913, episode:1, 2) - Jean Valjean
 Germinal (1913) - Etienne Lautier
 La Glu (1913) - Dr. Paul Cézambre / Dr. Williams (USA)
 Le chevalier de Maison-Rouge (1914)
 Patrie (1914) - Comte de Rysoor
 The Corsican Brothers (1917) - Dumas père
 Le chemineau (1917) - Le chemineau
 André Cornélis (1918)
 Marion Delorme (1918)
 L'énigme (1918)
 Honneur d'artiste (1920) - Charles Fabrice
 Enchantment (1920) - John Desmond
 The Three Masks (1921) - Della Corda
 Quatre-vingt-treize (1921) - Cimourdain
 Fromont jeune et Risler aîné (1921) - Guillaume Risler aîné
 L'empereur des pauvres (1922) - Jean Sarrias - l'oncle de Silvette, révolté contre la sociét
 The Black Diamond (1922) - Monsieur de Mitry
 Le bossu (1923)
 Les ombres qui passent (1924) - Barclay père
 Credo ou la tragédie de Lourdes (1924) - Vincent Leverrier
 Paris (1924) - François Roullet
 La closerie des Genets (1925) - Kérouan
 Le bossu (1925)
 The Red Head (1925) - Monsieur Lepic
 Napoleon (1927) - Moustache
 Le bonheur du jour (1927) - Le docteur Plessiers
 Lights of Paris (1928)
 The Divine Voyage (1929) - Claude Ferjac
 La symphonie pathétique (1930) - Christian Marks
 The Prosecutor Hallers (1930) - Le psychiatre Köhler
 Les Misérables (1934) - Monseigneur Myriel (final film role)

External links

Henry Krauss allrovi listing

1866 births
1935 deaths
French male film actors
French film directors
French male silent film actors
Silent film directors
20th-century French male actors
Place of birth missing